Mezilesí is a municipality and village in Pelhřimov District in the Vysočina Region of the Czech Republic. It has about 100 inhabitants.

Administrative parts
Villages of Holýšov and Zelená Ves are administrative parts of Mezilesí.

References

Villages in Pelhřimov District